Tyreek Solomon Pellerin, better known by his stage name SSGKobe, is an American rapper and singer-songwriter. He gained popularity with his 2021 single Thraxx who went viral on TikTok. He also gained traction through his multiple collaborations with music video director Cole Bennett.

Early life 
Tyreek Solomon Pellerin was born and raised in Lafayette, Louisiana.

Career

2018: Beginnings
Pellerin began making music influenced by his cousins who were also making music and had a home-studio. He recalls being adamant about sharing his music by fear of it not being appreciated by his local community.

2021–2022: Breakthrough
In February 2021, Pellerin released his breakthrough single Thrax, which would later go viral on TikTok. In April 2021, he released a six song EP titled KO. In November 2021, he released F*K EM, a collaboration with American rapper Lil Yachty. In January 2022, he released a single titled Don't Miss. In March 2022, he released his collaboration with American rapper Trippie Redd titled Escape Your Love. In April 2022, he featured on American rapper and producer Sonny Digital's song Guess What.

Sexual assault allegations 
In December 2022, Ka$hkenni, an artist, took to Instagram to accuse SSGKobe of forcing her to have sexual intercourse in a soundproof studio room on November 23, 2022.

Musical style 
Pellerin is recognized for his Auto-Tune-infused vocals and melody-driven trap music.

Discography

Studio albums

Mixtapes

Extended plays

References

Living people
African-American male rappers
Rappers from Louisiana
Southern hip hop musicians
21st-century American rappers
21st-century American male musicians
21st-century African-American musicians
Year of birth missing (living people)